Philip Attipoe (born 23 February 1963) is a Ghanaian sprinter. He competed in the men's 100 metres at the 1984 Summer Olympics.

References

External links
 

1963 births
Living people
Athletes (track and field) at the 1984 Summer Olympics
Ghanaian male sprinters
Olympic athletes of Ghana
Place of birth missing (living people)